The Scottish Rally Championship is a rallying series run throughout Scotland over the course of a year, that comprises seven gravel rallies and one tarmac event. Points are awarded to the top placed drivers and the driver scoring the highest number of points over the season is declared Champion

David Bogie began the year as defending champion after winning four out of the eight events in 2011.

The 2012 season began in the snow-covered forest tracks around Inverness on 18 February, with the season finale taking place around Perth on 6 October. 2012 was the final year of a two-year partnership with leading motorsport tyre manufacture, DMACK Tyres.

Following the Merrick Stages Rally in September, David Bogie and Kevin Rae were declared champions.

The award ceremony took place on 1 December 2012 at Hilton Treetops Hotel, Aberdeen.

2012 Calendar
In season 2012 there were 8 events held on a variety of surfaces.

2012 Results

Drivers Points Classification (Top 5)

** David Bogie finished third overall on the Colin McRae Forest Stages but, having already won the SRC title, was not registered for SRC points. This was to avoid affecting championship runner-up positions.

Points are awarded to the highest placed registered driver on each event as follows: 30, 28, 27, 26, and so on down to 1 point. 
At the end of the Championship, competitors will nominate their best 6 scores out of the 8 events as his/her final overall Championship score.

References

External links
 Scottish Rally Championship Homepage
 RSAC Scottish Rally Homepage

Scottish Rally Championship seasons
Scottish Rally Championship
Scottish Rally Championship